CMOC may refer to:

Canadian Museum of Civilization, the former name of the Canadian Museum of History, a museum in Hull, Gatineau, Quebec
Cheyenne Mountain Operations Center
Civil-military operations center
Commodity Markets Oversight Coalition
Check Mii Out Channel for the Nintendo Wii